Anima Mundi is the second album by the German/Swedish power metal band Dionysus.

Track listing
 "Divine" – 4:10
 "Bringer Of War" – 5:06
 "Anima Mundi" – 3:34
 "My Heart Is Crying" – 5:02
 "March For Freedom" – 6:05
 "What" – 5:17
 "Eyes Of The World" – 5:39
 "Forever More" – 4:54
 "Paradise Land" – 4:51
 Bonus Track
10. "Closer To The Sun" – 3:18
 2001 Pre-Production Bonus Track
11. "Holy War" – 5:30
12. "Pouring Rain" – 4:50
13. "Key Into The Past" – 5:17

Personnel 
 Olaf Hayer – vocals
 Johnny Öhlin – guitar
 Nobby Noberg – bass
 Ronny Milianowicz – drums
 Kaspar Dahlqvist – keyboard

Credits 
 Cover art - Derek Gores

2004 albums
Dionysus (band) albums
AFM Records albums
Albums produced by Jens Bogren